UFC Fight Night: Smith vs. Spann (also known as UFC Fight Night 192, UFC Vegas 37 and UFC on ESPN+ 50) was a mixed martial arts event produced by the Ultimate Fighting Championship that took place on September 18, 2021 at the UFC Apex facility in Enterprise, Nevada, part of the Las Vegas Metropolitan Area, United States.

Background
A light heavyweight bout between former UFC Light Heavyweight Championship title challenger Anthony Smith and Ryan Spann served as the main event.

A light heavyweight bout between Ion Cuțelaba and Devin Clark was rescheduled to take place at this event. The bout was previously scheduled to take place in May at UFC on ESPN: Reyes vs. Procházka, but Clark pulled out of that event citing injury.

A bantamweight bout between Tony Gravely and Nate Maness took place at this event. The pairing was previously scheduled to meet at UFC on ESPN: Whittaker vs. Gastelum, but it was scrapped after Maness was removed from the bout for undisclosed reasons.

A bantamweight bout between Montel Jackson and Danaa Batgerel was scheduled for the event. However, Batgerel was pulled from the event due to visa issues and replaced by JP Buys.

Cory McKenna was expected to face Emily Whitmire in a women's strawweight bout at this event. However, McKenna was removed from the event for an undisclosed reason and replaced by Hannah Goldy.

A women's flyweight bout between former KSW Women's Flyweight Champion Ariane Lipski and promotional newcomer Mandy Böhm took place at the event. The pairing was previously scheduled to take place two weeks earlier at UFC Fight Night: Brunson vs. Till, but it was removed from the card during the week leading up to that event as Böhm was sidelined due to illness.

A lightweight bout between Jim Miller and Niklas Motta was expected to take place at the event. However, Miller tested positive for COVID-19 a week before the event and was pulled from the contest. He was replaced by promotional newcomer Cameron VanCamp. In turn, the bout was scrapped in the days leading up to the event due to an undisclosed injury to one of the participants.

A lightweight bout between Dakota Bush and Rong Zhu was expected to take place at the event. However, Bush tested positive for COVID-19 during fight week and was replaced by Brandon Jenkins. At the weigh-ins, Zhu weighed in at 158 pounds, two pounds over the lightweight non-title fight limit. The bout proceeded at a catchweight and he forfeited 20% of his purse to his opponent.

Results

Bonus awards
The following fighters received $50,000 bonuses.

Fight of the Night: No bonus awarded.
Performance of the Night: Anthony Smith, Arman Tsarukyan, Nate Maness and Joaquin Buckley

See also 

 List of UFC events
 List of current UFC fighters
 2021 in UFC

References 

UFC Fight Night
2021 in mixed martial arts
September 2021 sports events in the United States
2021 in sports in Nevada
Mixed martial arts in Las Vegas
Sports competitions in Las Vegas